The Bishop of Limerick, Ardfert and Aghadoe was the Ordinary of the Church of Ireland diocese of Limerick, Ardfert and Aghadoe, which was in the Province of Cashel until 1833, then afterwards in the Province of Dublin.

History
The title was formed by the union of the see of Limerick and the see of Ardfert and Aghadoe in 1661. The united see consisted of most of County Limerick, all of County Kerry and a small part of County Cork. The bishop's seat (Cathedra) was located at the Cathedral Church of St Mary, Limerick. In 1976, Limerick, Ardfert and Aghadoe combined with Killaloe and Clonfert to form the united see of Limerick and Killaloe. This area, however, still has its own discrete officer, the Archdeacon of Limerick, Ardfert and Aghadoe: currently Simon Lumby.

List of bishops

References

Limerick, Ardfert and Aghadoe
Limerick, Ardfert and Aghadoe
 Bishop
Bishops of Limerick or Ardfert or of Aghadoe
Archdeacons of Limerick, Ardfert and Aghadoe